1st class Active State Councillor of the Russian Federation is the highest federal state civilian service rank of Russia. The following list is a list of all persons who was promoted to this rank during the period 2000–2004:

 Sergey Say
 Vladimir Bezrukov
 Igor Savolsky
 Dmitry Medvedev
 Vladislav Surkov
 Alexander Voronin
 Valery Kirpichnikov
 Andrey Popov
 Vladimir Goman
 Vladimir Dimov
 Natalia Fonareva
 Alexander Abramov
 Vladimir Rakhmanin
 Anvar Shamuzafarov
 Andrey Zadernyuk
 Andrey Vinogradov
 Grigory Balykhin
 Vasily Zhurakovsky
 Alexander Kiselev
 Herman Gref
 Lyudmila Vartazarova
 Natalia Dementieva
 Igor Shchyogolev
 Mikhail Fradkov
 Yury Brusnitsyn
 Vladimir Isakov
 Anatoly Usov
 Viktor Cheremukhin
 Gennady Batanov
 Vladimir Pospelov
 Alexey Volin
 Aleksandra Levitskaya
 Konstantin Merzlikin
 Igor Astapkin
 Alexander Nozdrachev
 Vladimir Simonov
 Alexander Drazhnyuk
 Yury Pavlenko
 Vladimir Kuliechev
 Valentin Ivanov
 Anatoly Vyalkov
 Andrey Vavra
 Leonid Drachevsky
 Sergey Kiriyenko
 Dmitry Kozak
 Simon Kordonsky
 Konstantin Pulikovsky
 Zoya Novozhilova
 Alexander Korchagin
 Vyacheslav Kokunov
 Alexander Kozlov
 Igor Mogilat
 Boris Yurlov
 Sergey Dankvert
 Anatoly Mikhalev
 Igor Yusufov
 Anatoly Popov
 Mikhail Trinoga
 Georgy Poltavchenko
 Vladimir Mau
 Aleksandr Kosopkin
 Alexander Golutva
 Yuri Koptev
 Pavel Rozhkov
 Dmitry Koryavov
 Mikhail Seslavinsky
 Oksana Labutina
 Yury Algunov
 Pyotr Latyshev
 Alexey Ulyukaev
 Sergey Shatalov
 Vladimir Vinogradov
 Anatoly Chaus
 Alexander Malakhov
 Igor Porshnev
 Vyacheslav Soltaganov
 Oleg Buklemishev
 Mikhail Sinelin
 Sergey Grigorov
 Alexander Bespalov
 Mikhail Barshchevsky
 Vasily Arzhantsev
 Mikhail Kozlov
 Petr Tkachenko
 Vladimir Sokolin
 Alexander Grigoryev
 Alexander Neradko
 Vyacheslav Ruksha
 Igor Slyunyayev
 Mikhail Dmitriev
 Elvira Nabiullina
 Mikhail Kalmykov
 Vitaly Menshikov
 Ivan Matlashov
 Leonid Tropko
 Boris Aleshin
 Viktor Zubkov
 Vladimir Yakunin
 Valery Buravchenko
 Galina Karelova
 Valery Yanvarev
 Viktor Bolotov
 Evald Antipenko
 Andrey Korotkov
 Mikhail Solonin
 Dmitry Aratsky
 Alexander Lotorev
 Sergey Kovalev
 Sergey Bolkhovitin
 Anatoly Vukolov
 Valery Soluyanov
 Abdul-Khakim Sultygov
 Valery Mikhaylov
 Igor Tsyganenko
 Natalya Timakova
 Sergey Gaydarzhi
 Boris Antonyuk
 Alexander Kiselev
 Alexander Brindikov
 Mikhail Kirpichnikov
 Sergey Vyazalov
 Tatyana Golikova
 Viacheslav Fetisov
 Vladimir Shumov
 Igor Borovkov
 Valery Parfenov
 Anton Drozdov
 Mikhail Kopeykin
 Garry Minkh
 Alexey Ardov
 Alexey Serko
 Alexander Beglov
 Arkady Dvorkovich
 Marina Entaltseva
 Dmitry Zhuykov
 Yury Zubakov
 Dmitry Kalimulin
 Alexander Karlin
 Anatoly Kvashnin
 Ilya Klebanov
 Alexander Manzhosin
 Nikolay Spassky
 Igor Shuvalov

See also
 State civilian and municipal service ranks in Russian Federation

References

Federal state civilian service ranks in the Russian Federation